Dimitrije "Mita" Đorđević (27 February 1922 – 5 March 2009) was a Serbian historian of modern European history, especially of the Balkans.

Biography
Đorđević was born in Belgrade to a prominent Serbian family. When he was a law student, the Germans invaded Yugoslavia during World War II and he joined the resistance movement of Dragoljub Mihailovic. Đorđević was captured by the Germans and was imprisoned, ultimately in Mauthausen-Gusen concentration camp in Austria. He survived the war, but was in turn imprisoned by the communist regime in post World War II Yugoslavia. After he was pardoned and released, Đorđević was eventually allowed to commence study at the University of Belgrade, where he was a student of Vaso Čubrilović (one of the members of the Young Bosnia who conspired to assassinate Franz Ferdinand which led to the outbreak of World War I). Đorđević was awarded his doctorate in 1962. In 1970, Đorđević took up a position as a Full Professor of History at the University of California, Santa Barbara, joining a strong faculty in European History including Joachim Remak, Frank J. Frost, Leonard Marsak, Alfred Gollin, and C. Warren Hollister. He was elected a member of the Serbian Academy of Science and Arts in 1985. A popular undergraduate lecturer and graduate mentor at the University of California, Santa Barbara, in 1992 many of his former students contributed to his Festschrift entitled Scholar, Patriot, Mentor: Historical Essays in Honor of Dimitrije Djordjevic. In retirement, Đorđević published his autobiography, Scars and Memory: Four Lives in One Lifetime, describing his World War II and post World War II experiences. Professor Đorđević died in Santa Barbara on March 5, 2009.

Publications
Dimitrije Đorđević, The Growth of Serbia to the Adriatic Sea and the Conference of Ambassadors, 1912 (Belgrade, 1956). [In Serbian]
Dimitrije Đorđević, Austro-Serbian Conflict over the Novibazar Railway Project (Belgrade, 1957). [In Serbian]
Dimitrije Đorđević (with Jopjo Tadić), The Customs War Between Austria-Hungary and Serbia (Belgrade, 1962). [In Serbian]
Dimitrije Đorđević, Milovan Milovanović (Belgrade, 1962). [In Serbian]
Dimitrije Đorđević, The National Revolutions of the Balkan Peoples (Belgrade, 1965). [In French]
Dimitrije Đorđević, History of Serbia, 1900-1918 (Thessalonika, 1970). [In Modern Greek]
Dimitrije Đorđević, The Creation of Yugoslavia (Santa Barbara, 1980).
Dimitrije Đorđević, (with Stephen Fischer-Galati), The Balkan Revolutionary Tradition (NY, 1981).
Dimitrije Đorđević, (co-edited with Bela K. Kiraly), East Central European Society and the Balkan Wars (NY, 1987).
Dimitrije Đorđević, Scars and Memory: Four Lives in One Lifetime (NY, 1994).

References

External links
 Biography on the website of SANU

1922 births
2009 deaths
20th-century Serbian historians
Members of the Serbian Academy of Sciences and Arts
University of California, Santa Barbara alumni
Yugoslav emigrants to the United States
American people of Serbian descent
University of California, Santa Barbara faculty
20th-century American historians
American male non-fiction writers
20th-century American male writers
Yugoslav historians